Renosto is an Italian surname. Notable people with the surname include:

Giovanni Renosto (born 1960), Italian cyclist
Mario Renosto (1929–1988), Italian footballer
Paolo Renosto (1935–1988), Italian  composer, conductor, and pianist

Italian-language surnames